Union Township is a township in Butler County, Kansas, USA.  As of the 2000 census, its population was 226.

Union Township was organized in 1879.

Geography
According to the USGS, it contains one cemetery, Latham.

Further reading

References

 USGS Geographic Names Information System (GNIS)

External links
 City-Data.com

Townships in Butler County, Kansas
Townships in Kansas